Faro was an electoral district that returned a member (known as an MLA) to the Legislative Assembly of the Yukon Territory in Canada between 1978 and 2002. It was created out of the riding of Pelly River and encompassed the community of Faro. It was situated on the traditional territory of the Ross River Dena Council of the Kaska Dena.

The riding was dissolved in 2002 and amalgamated into the new riding of Pelly-Nisutlin, which includes the communities of Faro, Teslin, Ross River, and Little Salmon.

Faro is the former seat of Yukon Liberal leader Jim McLachlan and New Democrat Trevor Harding, who briefly served as interim leader of the Yukon New Democratic Party and interim Leader of the Official Opposition after his party's defeat in the 2000 territorial election.

History

When partisan politics were first introduced to the Yukon, Faro was one of the territory's nine rural seats. Originally bordered by the ridings of Tatchun and Campbell, at the time of its dissolution it was bordered by the ridings of Mayo-Tatchun and Ross River-Southern Lakes.

Faro is the home of the Faro Mine, at one point the largest open pit lead–zinc mine in the world as well as a significant producer of silver and other natural resource ventures. At its peak in 1982, the community was home to 2,100 residents, but at the time of the riding's dissolution, the community of Faro was home to just 400 people. When the Faro Mine's operators announced the indefinite closure of the operation, the effect devastated the territorial economy, as it represented approximately 40% of territorial GDP. Several corporations sought to restart the Faro Mine, but the final attempt, that of Anvil Range Mining Corporation, ceased in January 1998, followed by the bankruptcy of Anvil Range.

Faro continued to shrink in population as a community as the successive mining operations went under. In 2002, the Yukon Electoral District Boundaries Commission ruled that Faro's population had fallen far below acceptable levels to merit its own riding. The riding of Faro was dissolved and the community of Faro joined the communities of Teslin, Ross River, and Little Salmon to form the new riding of Pelly-Nisutlin.

MLAs

Electoral results

2000 By-election

|-
 
| Liberal
| Jim McLachlan
|align="right"| 129
|align="right"| 65.5%
|align="right"| +42.6%

|NDP
| Harold Boehm
|align="right"| 66
|align="right"| 33.5%
|align="right"| -43.1%
|- bgcolor="white"
!align="left" colspan=3|Total
!align="right"| 197
!align="right"| 100.0%
!align="right"| –
|}
On the resignation of Trevor Harding (2000).

2000 general election

|-

|NDP
| Trevor Harding
| align="right"| 177
| align="right"| 76.6%
| align="right"| -17.7%
 
| Liberal
| Jim McLachlan
| align="right"| 53
| align="right"| 22.9%
| align="right"| +17.7%
|- bgcolor="white"
!align="left" colspan=3|Total
! align=right| 231
! align=right| 100.0%
! align=right| –
|}

1996 general election

|-

|NDP
| Trevor Harding
| align="right"| 530
| align="right"| 94.3%
| align="right"| +41.1%

| Liberal
| Ed Peake
| align="right"| 29
| align="right"| 5.2%
| align="right"| -41.0%
|- bgcolor="white"
!align="left" colspan=3|Total
! align=right| 562
! align=right| 100.0%
! align=right| –
|}

1992 general election

|-

|NDP
| Trevor Harding
| align="right"| 388
| align="right"| 53.2%
| align="right"| +10.4%

| Liberal
| Jim McLachlan
| align="right"| 337
| align="right"| 46.2%
| align="right"| +9.1%
|- bgcolor="white"
!align="left" colspan=3|Total
! align=right| 729
! align=right| 100.0%
! align=right| –
|}

1989 general election

|-

| NDP
| Maurice Byblow
| align="right"| 194
| align="right"| 42.8%
| align="right"| +9.3%
|-

| Liberal
| Jim McLachlan
| align="right"| 168
| align="right"| 37.1%
| align="right"| -2.2%
|-

|-
! align=left colspan=3|Total
! align=right| 453
! align=right| 100.0%
! align=right| –
|}

1985 general election

|-

| Liberal
| Jim McLachlan
| align="right"| 142
| align="right"| 39.3%
| align="right"| +17.1%
|-

| NDP
| Sibyl Frei
| align="right"| 121
| align="right"| 33.5%
| align="right"| -15.8%
|-

|-
! align=left colspan=3|Total
! align=right| 361
! align=right| 100.0%
! align=right| –
|}

1982 general election

|-

| NDP
| Maurice Byblow
| align="right"| 357
| align="right"| 49.3%
| align="right"| +10.4%
|-

|-

| Liberal
| Wayne Peace
| align="right"| 160
| align="right"| 22.1%
| align="right"| +22.1%
|-
! align=left colspan=3|Total
! align=right| 724
! align=right| 100.0%
! align=right| –
|}

1978 general election

|-

| Independent
| Maurice Byblow
| align="right"| 361
| align="right"| 60.1%
| align="right"| –
|-

| NDP
| Stuart McCall
| align="right"| 231
| align="right"| 38.9%
| align="right"| –
|-
! align=left colspan=3|Total
! align=right| 594
! align=right| 100.0%
! align=right| –

References

External links
Elections Yukon

Former Yukon territorial electoral districts